Celtic Park is an association football stadium based in Castlebar, County Mayo. It was the home ground of Castlebar Celtic who played in the Women's National League (WNL), the top tier of Irish women's football between 2011 and 2016. It remains home to Castlebar Celtic's associated men's team, who play at regional level in the Mayo Association Football League.

History

Castlebar Celtic purchased Flannelly's Field in 1954 for £1,879. They also spent £123 on drainage and £400 renovating a clubhouse. Two old CIÉ buses were procured to act as dressing rooms, bringing the total expenditure to £3,000. Most of the money was raised through a series of carnivals and dances. The first match played in Celtic Park was on 4 May 1958, a challenge game between Castlebar Celtic and Castlebar A. The first competitive game in the ground was between Castlebar Celtic and Westport United the following Sunday, in the Mayo Area Final of the Connaught Cup. Frank Roache scored as Celtic won 1–0. The ground was redeveloped in 2001 with new walls and dugouts.

References

Association football venues in the Republic of Ireland
Sports venues in County Mayo
Castlebar Celtic F.C.